Shuangfeng Temple is a Buddhist temple located in Rongcheng District of Jieyang, Guangdong, China. Alongside the Kaiyuan Temple and Lingshan Temple, it is one of the Three Great Buddhist Temples of Chaojun.  It had been on the list of The Eight Views of Jieyang - The evening gong at Shuangfeng Temple.

History
Shuangfeng Temple was built in 1140 by master Fashan, under the Southern Song dynasty (1127–1279). The temple was dilapidated with huge losses of the cultural relics in 1276. It was rebuilt in 1308 and destroyed in wars during the late Yuan dynasty (1271–1368). In 1391, at the dawn of the Ming dynasty (1368–1644), master Shishan relocated the temple to today's Rongcheng District. In 1728, in the reign of Yongzheng Emperor of the Qing dynasty (1644–1911), Part of the temple was destroyed by a typhoon, and then magistrate Chen Shuzhi restored it. In 1925, magistrate Chen Zhuofan used it as a school. During the ten-year Cultural Revolution the Red Guards had attacked the temple in 1966. Almost all of the volumes of scriptures, historical documents, and other works of art were either removed, damaged or destroyed in the massive socialist movement. After the 3rd Plenary Session of the 11th Central Committee of the Communist Party of China, according to the national policy of free religious belief, Shuangfeng Temple was officially reopened to the public in 1992. Reconstruction of Shuangfeng Temple, commenced on December 25, 1986 and was completed in 1991. Shi Yaoyu was appointed as abbot of the temple by the State Administration for Religious Affairs.

Architecture
Along the central axis of the temple stand seven buildings including the Shanmen, Hall of Dabei, Four Heavenly Kings Hall, Mahavira Hall, and the Buddhist Texts Library. Subsidiary structures were built on both sides of the central axis including the Drum Tower, Bell Tower, and Manjusri Hall.

Gallery

References

Buddhist temples in Guangdong
Buildings and structures in Jieyang
Tourist attractions in Jieyang
1991 establishments in China
21st-century Buddhist temples
Religious buildings and structures completed in 1991